Ranatra is a genus of slender predatory insects of the family Nepidae, known as water scorpions or water stick-insects. There are around 100 Ranatra species found in freshwater habitats around the world, both in warm and temperate regions, with the highest diversity in South America (almost 50 species) and Asia (about 30 species, reviewed in 1972). Fewer are found elsewhere, but include several African, some in North America, three from Australia and three from the Palearctic, notably the relatively well-known European R. linearis. Since Ranatra belongs to the family Nepidae which in turn belongs to the order Hemiptera, ranatrids are considered "true bugs".

These brown insects are primarily found in stagnant or slow-moving water like ponds, marshes and canals, but can also be seen in streams. Exceptionally they have been recorded from hypersaline lakes and brackish lagoons.

Biology
The front legs of bugs in Ranatra are strong and used to grasp prey. They typically eat other insects, tadpoles and small fish, which they pierce with their proboscis and inject a saliva which both sedates and begins to digest their prey. They are sit-and-wait predators that reside among water plants and position themselves head-down with their grasping legs extended out to surprise passing prey. At least one species will also swim in open water at night to catch zooplanktonic organisms. Like other members in the family they have a long tail-like siphon, or breathing tube, on the rear end of their body. The adult body length is generally  depending on the exact species, and females average larger than males of the same species. The siphon is typically almost the same size, but varies from less than half the body length to somewhat longer. Two of the largest species are the East Asian R. chinensis and South American R. magna. Ranatra do have wings and they can fly.

The adults are active year-round, except in extreme cold. Their eggs are positioned on plants just below the water surface, but in some species they can be placed in mud. The eggs typically take two to four weeks to hatch and the young take about two months to mature.

Among the four genera in the Ranatrinae subfamily, Austronepa and Goondnomdanepa are restricted to Australia. Cercotmetus from Asia to New Guinea resembles Ranatra, although the former has a distinctly shorter siphon.

Species
The Global Biodiversity Information Facility lists:

 Ranatra absona Drake & De Carlo, 1953
 Ranatra acapulcana Drake & De Carlo, 1953
 Ranatra adelmorpha Nieser, 1975
 Ranatra aethiopica Montandon, 1903
 Ranatra akoitachta Nieser, 1996
 Ranatra ameghinoi De Carlo, 1970
 Ranatra annulipes Stål, 1854
 Ranatra attenuata Kuitert, 1949
 Ranatra australis Hungerford, 1922 i c g b (southern water scorpion)
 Ranatra bachmanni De Carlo, 1954
 Ranatra bilobata Tran & Nguyen, 2016
 Ranatra biroi Lundblad, 1933
 Ranatra bottegoi Montandon, 1903
 Ranatra brasiliensis De Carlo, 1946
 Ranatra brevicauda Montandon, 1905
 Ranatra brevicollis Montandon, 1910 i c g b
 Ranatra buenoi Hungerford, 1922 i c g b
 Ranatra camposi Montandon, 1907
 Ranatra capensis Germar, 1837
 Ranatra cardamomensis Zettel, Phauk, Kheam & Freitag, 2017
 Ranatra chagasi De Carlo, 1946
 Ranatra chariensis Poisson, 1949
 Ranatra chinensis Mayr, 1865
 Ranatra cinnamomea Distant, 1904
 Ranatra compressicollis Montandon, 1898
 Ranatra costalimai De Carlo, 1954
 Ranatra cruzi De Carlo, 1950
 Ranatra curtafemorata Kuitert, 1949
 Ranatra denticulipes Montandon, 1907
 Ranatra digitata Hafiz & Pradhan, 1949
 Ranatra diminuta Montandon, 1907
 Ranatra dispar Montandon, 1903
 Ranatra distanti Montandon, 1910
 Ranatra doesburgi De Carlo, 1963
 Ranatra dolichodentata Kuitert, 1949
 Ranatra dormientis Zhang et al., 1994
 Ranatra drakei Hungerford, 1922
 Ranatra ecuadoriensis De Carlo, 1950
 Ranatra elongata Fabricius, 1790
 Ranatra emaciata Montandon, 1907
 Ranatra fabricii Guérin-Méneville, 1857
 Ranatra falloui Montandon, 1907
 Ranatra feana Montandon, 1903
 Ranatra fianarantsoana Poisson, 1963
 Ranatra filiformis Fabricius, 1790
 Ranatra flagellata Lansbury, 1972
 Ranatra flokata Nieser & Burmeister, 1998
 Ranatra fusca Palisot, 1820 i c g b (brown waterscorpion)
 Ranatra fuscoannulata Distant, 1904
 Ranatra galantae Nieser, 1969
 Ranatra gracilis Dallas, 1850
 Ranatra grandicollis Montandon, 1907
 Ranatra grandocula Bergroth, 1893
 Ranatra hechti De Carlo, 1967
 Ranatra heoki Tran & Poggi, 2019
 Ranatra heydeni Montandon, 1909
 Ranatra horvathi Montandon, 1910
 Ranatra hungerfordi Kuitert, 1949
 Ranatra incisa Chen, Nieser & Ho, 2004
 Ranatra instaurata Montandon, 1914
 Ranatra insulata Barber, 1939
 Ranatra jamaicana Drake & De Carlo, 1953
 Ranatra katsara Nieser, 1997
 Ranatra kirkaldyi Torre-bueno, 1905 i c g b
 Ranatra lanei De Carlo, 1946
 Ranatra lansburyi Chen, Nieser & Ho, 2004
 Ranatra lenti De Carlo, 1950
 Ranatra lethierryi Montandon, 1907
 Ranatra libera Zettel, 1999
 Ranatra linearis (Linnaeus, 1758) i c g
 Ranatra longipes Stål, 1861
 Ranatra lualalai Poisson, 1964
 Ranatra lubwae Poisson, 1965
 Ranatra machrisi Nieser & Burmeister, 1998
 Ranatra macrophthalma Herrich-Schäffer, 1849
 Ranatra maculosa Kuitert, 1949
 Ranatra magna Kuitert, 1949
 Ranatra malayana Lundblad, 1933
 Ranatra mediana Montandon, 1910
 Ranatra megalops Lansbury, 1972
 Ranatra mixta Montandon, 1907
 Ranatra moderata Kuitert, 1949
 Ranatra montei De Carlo, 1946
 Ranatra montezuma Polhemus, 1976
 Ranatra natalensis Distant, 1904
 Ranatra natunaensis Lansbury, 1972
 Ranatra neivai De Carlo, 1946
 Ranatra nieseri Tran & Nguyen, 2016
 Ranatra nigra Herrich-Schaeffer, 1849
 Ranatra nodiceps Gerstaecker, 1873
 Ranatra nodioeps Gerstaecker, 1873
 Ranatra obscura Montandon, 1907
 Ranatra occidentalis Lansbury, 1972
 Ranatra odontomeros Nieser, 1996
 Ranatra oliveiracesari De Carlo, 1946
 Ranatra operculata Kuitert, 1949
 Ranatra ornitheia Nieser, 1975
 Ranatra parmata Mayr, 1865
 Ranatra parvipes Signoret, 1861
 Ranatra parvula Kuitert, 1949
 Ranatra pittieri Montandon, 1910
 Ranatra protense Montandon
 Ranatra quadridentata Stål, 1862 i c g b
 Ranatra rabida Buchanan White, 1879
 Ranatra rafflesi Tran & D.Polhemus, 2012
 Ranatra rapax Stål, 1865
 Ranatra recta Chen, Nieser & Ho, 2004
 Ranatra robusta Montandon, 1905
 Ranatra sagrai Drake & De Carlo, 1953
 Ranatra sarmientoi De Carlo, 1967
 Ranatra sattleri De Carlo, 1967
 Ranatra schuhi D.Polhemus & J.Polhemus, 2012
 Ranatra segrega Montandon, 1913
 Ranatra signoreti Montandon, 1905
 Ranatra similis Drake & De Carlo, 1953
 Ranatra siolii De Carlo, 1970
 Ranatra sjostedti Montandon, 1911
 Ranatra spatulata Kuitert, 1949
 Ranatra spinifrons Montandon, 1905
 Ranatra spoliata Montandon, 1912
 Ranatra stali Montandon, 1905
 Ranatra sterea Chen, Nieser & Ho, 2004
 Ranatra subinermis Montandon, 1907
 Ranatra sulawesii Nieser & Chen, 1991
 Ranatra surinamensis De Carlo, 1963
 Ranatra texana Hungerford, 1930
 Ranatra thai Lansbury, 1972
 Ranatra titilaensis Hafiz & Pradhan, 1949
 Ranatra travassosi De Carlo, 1950
 Ranatra tridentata Poisson, 1965
 Ranatra tuberculifrons Montandon, 1907
 Ranatra unicolor Scott, 1874
 Ranatra unidentata Stål, 1861
 Ranatra usingeri De Carlo, 1970
 Ranatra varicolor Distant, 1904
 Ranatra varipes Stål, 1861
 Ranatra vitshumbii Poisson, 1949
 Ranatra wagneri Hungerford, 1929
 Ranatra weberi De Carlo, 1970
 Ranatra williamsi Kuitert, 1949
 Ranatra zeteki Drake & De Carlo, 1953

Data sources: i = ITIS, c = Catalogue of Life, g = GBIF, b = Bugguide.net

References

External links
 
 

Nepidae
Nepomorpha genera